William "Shorty" Cantlon
(1904 in Paris, Illinois – May 30, 1947 in Indianapolis, Indiana) was an American racecar driver. He was killed on May 30, 1947, while racing in the 1947 Indianapolis 500 on lap 40 after swerving into the outside retaining wall to avoid the spinning car of Bill Holland, who recovered from the spin to finish second. After his body was removed, Cantlon's car was left resting against the wall until the end of the 200-lap race.

Indianapolis 500 results

See also
List of fatalities at Indianapolis

External links
 Mauri Rose biography from the show "The Indy 500, a Race For Heroes" Cantlon accident can be seen at approximately 16 minutes, 20 seconds in.

1904 births
1947 deaths
Filmed deaths in motorsport
Indianapolis 500 drivers
People from Paris, Illinois
Racing drivers from Illinois
Racing drivers who died while racing
Sports deaths in Indiana
AAA Championship Car drivers